In linear algebra, the permanent of a square matrix is a function of the matrix similar to the determinant. The permanent, as well as the determinant, is a polynomial in the entries of the matrix. Both are special cases of a more general function of a matrix called the immanant.

Definition 
The permanent of an  matrix  is defined as

The sum here extends over all elements σ of the symmetric group Sn; i.e. over all permutations of the numbers 1, 2, ..., n.

For example,

and

The definition of the permanent of A differs from that of the determinant of A in that the signatures of the permutations are not taken into account.

The permanent of a matrix A is denoted per A, perm A, or Per A, sometimes with parentheses around the argument. Minc uses Per(A) for the permanent of rectangular matrices, and per(A) when A is a square matrix. Muir and Metzler use the notation .

The word, permanent, originated with Cauchy in 1812 as “fonctions symétriques permanentes” for a related type of function, and was used by Muir and Metzler in the modern, more specific, sense.

Properties 
If one views the permanent as a map that takes n vectors as arguments, then it is a multilinear map and it is symmetric (meaning that any order of the vectors results in the same permanent). Furthermore, given a square matrix  of order n:
 perm(A) is invariant under arbitrary permutations of the rows and/or columns of A. This property may be written symbolically as perm(A) = perm(PAQ) for any appropriately sized permutation matrices P and Q,
 multiplying any single row or column of A by a scalar s changes perm(A) to s⋅perm(A),
 perm(A) is invariant under transposition, that is, perm(A) = perm(AT).
 If  is a triangular matrix, i.e. , whenever  or, alternatively, whenever , then its permanent (and determinant as well) equals the product of the diagonal entries:

Relation to determinants 

Laplace's expansion by minors for computing the determinant along a row, column or diagonal extends to the permanent by ignoring all signs.

For every ,

For example, expanding along the first column,

while expanding along the last row gives,

On the other hand, the basic multiplicative property of determinants is not valid for permanents. A simple example shows that this is so.

Unlike the determinant, the permanent has no easy geometrical interpretation; it is mainly used in combinatorics, in treating boson Green's functions in quantum field theory, and in determining state probabilities of boson sampling systems. However, it has two graph-theoretic interpretations: as the sum of weights of cycle covers of a directed graph, and as the sum of weights of perfect matchings in a bipartite graph.

Applications

Symmetric tensors

The permanent arises naturally in the study of the symmetric tensor power of Hilbert spaces. For , we define the symmetric product of these elements by

Applying the Cauchy–Schwarz inequality, we find that , and that

Cycle covers

Any square matrix  can be viewed as the adjacency matrix of a weighted directed graph on vertex set , with  representing the weight of the arc from vertex i to vertex j.
A cycle cover of a weighted directed graph is a collection of vertex-disjoint directed cycles in the digraph that covers all vertices in the graph. Thus, each vertex i in the digraph has a unique "successor"  in the cycle cover, and so  represents a permutation on V. Conversely, any permutation  on V corresponds to a cycle cover with arcs from each vertex i to vertex .

If the weight of a cycle-cover is defined to be the product of the weights of the arcs in each cycle, then

implying that

Thus the permanent of A is equal to the sum of the weights of all cycle-covers of the digraph.

Perfect matchings

Thus the permanent of A is equal to the sum of the weights of all perfect matchings of the graph.

Permanents of (0, 1) matrices

Enumeration 
The answers to many counting questions can be computed as permanents of matrices that only have 0 and 1 as entries.

Let Ω(n,k) be the class of all (0, 1)-matrices of order n with each row and column sum equal to k. Every matrix A in this class has perm(A) > 0. The incidence matrices of projective planes are in the class Ω(n2 + n + 1, n + 1) for n an integer > 1. The permanents corresponding to the smallest projective planes have been calculated. For n = 2, 3, and 4 the values are 24, 3852 and 18,534,400 respectively. Let Z be the incidence matrix of the projective plane with n = 2, the Fano plane. Remarkably, perm(Z) = 24 = |det (Z)|, the absolute value of the determinant of Z. This is a consequence of Z being a circulant matrix and the theorem:

If A is a circulant matrix in the class Ω(n,k) then if k > 3, perm(A) > |det (A)| and if k = 3, perm(A) = |det (A)|. Furthermore, when k = 3, by permuting rows and columns, A can be put into the form of a direct sum of e copies of the matrix Z and consequently, n = 7e and perm(A) = 24e.

Permanents can also be used to calculate the number of permutations with restricted (prohibited) positions. For the standard n-set {1, 2, ..., n}, let  be the (0, 1)-matrix where aij = 1 if i → j is allowed in a permutation and aij = 0 otherwise. Then perm(A) is equal to the number of permutations of the n-set that satisfy all the restrictions. Two well known special cases of this are the solution of the derangement problem and the ménage problem: the number of permutations of an n-set with no fixed points (derangements) is given by

where J is the n×n all 1's matrix and I is the identity matrix, and the ménage numbers are given by

where I is the (0, 1)-matrix with nonzero entries in positions (i, i + 1) and (n, 1).

 Bounds 
The Bregman–Minc inequality, conjectured by H. Minc in 1963 and proved by L. M. Brégman in 1973, gives an upper bound for the permanent of an n × n (0, 1)-matrix. If A has ri ones in row i for each 1 ≤ i ≤ n, the inequality states that

 Van der Waerden's conjecture 
In 1926, Van der Waerden conjectured that the minimum permanent among all  doubly stochastic matrices is n!/nn, achieved by the matrix for which all entries are equal to 1/n. Proofs of this conjecture were published in 1980 by B. Gyires and in 1981 by G. P. Egorychev and D. I. Falikman; Egorychev's proof is an application of the Alexandrov–Fenchel inequality. For this work, Egorychev and Falikman won the Fulkerson Prize in 1982.

 Computation 

The naïve approach, using the definition, of computing permanents is computationally infeasible even for relatively small matrices. One of the fastest known algorithms is due to H. J. Ryser. Then

It may be rewritten in terms of the matrix entries as follows:

The permanent is believed to be more difficult to compute than the determinant. While the determinant can be computed in polynomial time by Gaussian elimination, Gaussian elimination cannot be used to compute the permanent. Moreover, computing the permanent of a (0,1)-matrix is #P-complete. Thus, if the permanent can be computed in polynomial time by any method, then FP = #P, which is an even stronger statement than P = NP.

MacMahon's master theorem

Another way to view permanents is via multivariate generating functions. Let  be a square matrix of order n. Consider the multivariate generating function:

As a generalization, for any sequence of n non-negative integers,  define:
 as the coefficient of  inMacMahon's master theorem''' relating permanents and determinants is:

where I is the order n identity matrix and X is the diagonal matrix with diagonal 

Rectangular matrices
The permanent function can be generalized to apply to non-square matrices. Indeed, several authors make this the definition of a permanent and consider the restriction to square matrices a special case. Specifically, for an m × n matrix  with m ≤ n, define

where P(n,m) is the set of all m-permutations of the n-set {1,2,...,n}.

Ryser's computational result for permanents also generalizes. Then

Systems of distinct representatives
The generalization of the definition of a permanent to non-square matrices allows the concept to be used in a more natural way in some applications. For instance:

Let S1, S2, ..., Sm be subsets (not necessarily distinct) of an n-set with m ≤ n. The incidence matrix of this collection of subsets is an m × n (0,1)-matrix A. The number of systems of distinct representatives (SDR's) of this collection is perm(A'').

See also
Computing the permanent
Bapat–Beg theorem, an application of permanents in order statistics
Slater determinant, an application of permanents in quantum mechanics
Hafnian

Notes

References

Further reading
  Contains a proof of the Van der Waerden conjecture.

External links

Algebra
Linear algebra
Matrix theory
Permutations